The economy of Salvador, Bahia is the 8th largest regional economy in Brazil.

History

The city's port has always played a key role in the local and regional economy. During much of the Portuguese colonial period it was Brazil's principal port, exporting sugar, cacao, and tobacco and receiving tens of thousands Portuguese immigrants and African slaves.

The port and city still play a critical role in the economy of Northeastern Brazil, providing commercial services for a vast region and exporting cocoa, sisal, soybeans, and petrochemical products. Local industries include fishing, oil and gas extraction, cigar manufacture, a petrochemical complex at Camaçari, an oil refinery, and tourism. The Centro Industrial de Aratu, a planned industrial park, occupies a vast area around the Bay of Aratu and is home to over 100 industrial firms.

References